"Gimme Little Sign" is a classic soul music song, originally performed by Brenton Wood and written by Wood (under his real name, Alfred Smith), Joe Hooven and Jerry Winn. The charted versions were Wood's, Peter Andre's, the Sattalites', and Danielle Brisebois's.

History
The song was released in 1967 on the album Oogum Boogum. Wood's version peaked at number nine on the US Billboard Hot 100 chart, and also was top 10 in the UK Singles Chart and Australia. Mighty Mo Rodgers played the electronic organ on the recording.

Charts

Weekly charts

Year-end charts

Peter Andre version

"Gimme Little Sign" was covered by Australian artist Peter Andre and released as the second single from his self-titled debut album. The single was released on October 26, 1992, through Melodian Records. The single peaked at number three on the Australian Singles Chart, achieving platinum status. It was the 12th highest-selling single of 1993 in Australia, and went on to win him an ARIA Award in 1993 for highest-selling Australian single of the year

Track listing
CD1 and cassette single
 "Gimme Little Sign" (single version) – 3:28
 "Gimme Little Sign" (Tony & Asha's mix) – 6:29

CD2
 "Gimme Little Sign" (single version) – 3:28
 "Gimme Little Sign" (Tony & Asha's mix) – 6:29
 "Gimme Little Sign" (Phil & Ian's 12-inch mix) – 5:57
 "Gimme Little Sign" (demonstration version) – 3:25
 "Drive Me Crazy" (Crazy Cool Funk mix) – 6:34

Charts

Weekly charts

Year-end charts

Certification

Other cover versions
Syl Johnson's version, heard in his 1979 album Uptown Shakedown, was raved by Billboard as one of the album's highlights alongside "Mystery Lady" and "Who's Gonna Love You".

The Sattalites's version, titled "Gimme Some Kinda Sign", in June 1988 peaked at number 44 on Canada's RPM 100 Singles chart and number nine on RPM Adult Contemporary chart. The single's B-side track is "Lively Ivy".

Danielle Brisebois's version, released as the second single from her 1994 album Arrive All over You, peaked at number 75 on the British charts on the week ending September 3, 1995, at number 51 on German singles chart on the week ending April 24, 1995, and at number 23 on the Swedish charts. The music video of the Brisebois version was directed by Kate Garner and Paul Archard. Other tracks of the single are "Just Missed the Train" and "Ain't Gonna Cry No More".

References

External links
 
 
 

1967 songs
1967 singles
1992 singles
1994 singles
Jo Jo Zep & The Falcons songs
Peter Andre songs
Danielle Brisebois songs
ARIA Award-winning songs
Mushroom Records singles
Chrysalis Records singles
Brenton Wood songs